Sandro Ferracuti (born 8 May 1940) is a former Italian Air Force general. He served as Chief of Staff of the Italian Air Force from 3 August 2001 to 4 August 2004.

References 

Living people
1940 births
Place of birth missing (living people)
Italian aviators
Italian Air Force generals